The Max Headroom Show is a television series that debuted in the UK in 1985. It was produced by Carlton TV and aired on Channel 4, with an initial series of 13 shows. It featured actor Matt Frewer playing the role of pseudo-computer-generated talk-show host Max Headroom. It returned in 1986 for a second series of six episodes plus a Christmas special. The final series aired in 1987.

Series overview

Episodes

Television Movie

In order to introduce the character who would host their new music video program, Channel Four broadcast a short (one-hour) science fiction movie, Max Headroom: 20 Minutes into the Future, which supplied him with a backstory.  The events and characters in this movie were never again referred to in music video or talk show versions of Max Headroom.  (Two years later, however, the movie was remade into the pilot episode of an American science fiction television series).

Series 1
The first series employed Max as a music video host, often interrupting the videos with his commentary and antics. Each program included hits from the early eighties and newer releases. The show aired at 6pm every Saturday, giving peak time exposure to many artists who were unknown in the UK at the time. These included the bands Makromad, German band Ledernacken and musician Udo Lindenberg, and the Australian band Severed Heads.

Series 2
The second series consisted of clips and music videos from the first series plus additional material. Max often had a guest in a lounge bar setting; Max did not appear in the setting, but appeared on a television set placed on the bar top. The interviews were brief, and usually digressed into Max's obsession with golf. 

This series was first screened in the US on Cinemax during November and December 1985, with a new voice over introduction by Max: "He's the toast of the town (lightly buttered). He's the non-fattening sugar substitute in your tea. He's a bon vivant, a gaucho amigo, a goomba, a mensch, and the fifth musketeer. He's the apple of your eye and aren't you glad he's here. Direct from a wax and shine at the car-wash around the corner, it's the man of the hour, or for at least a good 30 minutes, Max Headroom."

Series 3
The third series added a studio audience with which Max would interact. Max conducted a quiz in which members of the audience participated. Often the announced prize was not awarded, or the quiz was "cut for time" because Max took too long to explain the rules (which changed every week). Most episodes included a performance art act in the studio. Each week featured a special guest, often appearing in the studio, but sometimes appearing remotely on a television screen. Max would often sing comedic jazz or swing songs of his creation. This series premièred in the US between August and December 1986 on Cinemax.

Christmas special
Between the second and third series, an hour-long special, entitled Max Headroom's Giant Christmas Turkey aired on Channel 4 at 10pm on Boxing Day 1986. This programme had already premiered in the US on 18 December 1986, under the title The Max Headroom Christmas Special and was repeated several times over the holiday period on Cinemax. In the UK, the show was repeated by Channel 4 on Christmas Eve 1988.

Spin-offs
Following the first mini-season of ABC's Max Headroom science fiction adventure series in the spring of 1987, Cinemax produced another series of talk shows, The Original Max Talking Headroom Show, this time in New York and without British participation. The six-part series aired every two weeks on Cinemax between July 1987 and October 1987, the last two episodes coinciding with the first two of the second season of the sci-fi show. Unlike previous Cinemax episodes of Max, these six were not broadcast in the UK.  Two weeks after this Cinemax series ended, the ABC show was cancelled.  Max Headroom disappeared from the airwaves.  His only further appearances were a couple of leftover ABC episodes broadcast as timeslot-fillers in the spring of 1988, a cameo on Sesame Street around the same time, and another cameo on a Comic Relief program in the spring of 1989.

References

External links
 The Max Headroom Chronicles - comprehensive information site

1985 British television series debuts
1987 British television series endings
1980s British comic science fiction television series
Max Headroom
Channel 4 original programming
1980s British television talk shows